Brzeg Synagogue - a former synagogue building, located in Brzeg, Poland. At the beginning of the sixteenth century a former synagogue building stood in the location of the present, but burnt down in 1507. 

The present day building of the synagogue was built by Jews from Biała, who settled in Brzeg in 1660. The first rabbi was recruited by the gmina in 1816. The building had undergone a major renovation in 1899, the second in 1937. During the Kristallnacht through November 9 to 10, 1938, the NSDAP members had destroyed the interior of the synagogue and publicly burnt the Torah. In 1940, the synagogue was reconstructed to serve as a residence.

See also 
 List of synagogues in Poland

References

Brzeg County
Synagogues in Poland destroyed by Nazi Germany
Synagogues destroyed during Kristallnacht